Samuel Story Davis (25 May 1900 – 1988) was an English footballer who played in the Football League for Accrington Stanley, Tranmere Rovers and Stoke.

Career
Davis was born in Marsden, Tyne and Wear and played for his works team, Whitburn Colliery, before joining Stoke in 1923. He made two appearances for Stoke before leaving for Tranmere Rovers and then Accrington Stanley. After failing to forge a career in professional football he returned to the North East and played for Spennymoor.

Career statistics
Source:

References

1900 births
1988 deaths
English footballers
Association football fullbacks
Whitburn Colliery Welfare F.C. players
Stoke City F.C. players
Tranmere Rovers F.C. players
Accrington Stanley F.C. (1891) players
Spennymoor United F.C. players
English Football League players
Date of death missing